This is a list of alumni and presidents of the University of North Florida.

Alumni

 Janet H. Adkins, Former member of the Florida House of Representatives
 Coreen Carroll, Cannabis chef
 Patrick Faber, Deputy prime minister and minister of education in Belize
 Drayton Florence, Former NFL player
 Nat Glover, Former sheriff of Jacksonville, Florida
 Todd Haley, NFL coach, including head coach for the Kansas City Chiefs and offensive coordinator for the Arizona Cardinals, Pittsburgh Steelers, and Cleveland Browns
 Rebecca Heflin, Romance novelist (pseudonym of Dianne Farb); attorney
 Kasper Hjulmand, Manager of the Denmark national football team
 Betty Holzendorf, Former member of the Florida Senate 
 Yoanna House, Fashion model and winner of America's Next Top Model
 Will Ludwigsen, Writer of horror, mystery, and science fiction
 Greg Mullins, Pitcher for the Milwaukee Brewers
 Kevin Phelan, Golfer
 Sara Walsh, ESPN broadcaster
 Mike Wood, Pitcher for the Texas Rangers
 Anita Zucker, Former CEO of the Hudson's Bay Company

Presidents

The University of North Florida has had nine presidents:

 
University of North Florida